DNSA may refer to:

 Dansyl amide, a fluorescent dye
 3,5-Dinitrosalicylic acid, used in assay of alpha-amylase